Huarpea is a genus of flowering plants in the family Asteraceae.

Species
There is only one known species, Huarpea andina, found only in San Juan Province in Argentina.

References

Barnadesioideae
Monotypic Asteraceae genera
Endemic flora of Argentina
Taxa named by Ángel Lulio Cabrera